= One Week to Save Your Marriage =

- Genre: Reality
- Presented by: Dr. Robi Ludwig
- Country of origin: United States
- Original language: English
- No. of seasons: 2
- No. of episodes: 9

Production
- Running time: 25 mins.

Original release
- Network: TLC
- Release: August 7, 2006 – June 27, 2007

One Week to Save Your Marriage is an American reality television series hosted by psychotherapist Dr. Robi Ludwig on TLC. Dr. Robi Ludwig counsels married couples who are desperate to rescue their relationships.

== Episode list ==
=== Season 1: 2006 ===
Ep#	Title	Original air date	Synopsis
1	Anger Mis-Management	August 7, 2006	
2	A Love Gone Cold	August 14, 2006	
3	Bored by Him	August 21, 2006	

=== Season 2: 2007 ===
Ep#	Title	Original air date	Synopsis
1	The Cheating Game	March 26, 2007	A husband admits to having had several affairs.
2	Like Cat and Dog	April 2, 2007	Reducing anger and increasing the level of communication.
3	Ships That Pass in the Night	April 9, 2007	For the past six years a couple have worked opposite shifts.
4	Losing Control	June 13, 2007	After more than four years together, Larry and Jennifer find their age difference causing a rift in their marriage.
5	Pals or Partners?	June 20, 2007	A couple, who eloped after a five-week romance, head for divorce.
6	Mr. Bossy	June 27, 2007	A couple with a 10-year age difference needs help with their marriage.

== Reception ==
Common Sense Media rated the show 2 out of 5 stars.
